The White House social secretary is responsible for the planning, coordination and execution of official social events at the White House, the official residence and principal workplace of the president of the United States.

Function
The social secretary is head of the White House Social Office, located in the East Wing of the White House Complex. The social secretary plans events ranging from those as simple as a tea for the first lady and a single official guest, to dinners for more than 200 guests. The social secretary works with the White House chief usher to coordinate domestic staff and with the chief of protocol of the United States, an official within the United States Department of State, to plan state visits and accompanying state dinners. The social secretary works with the White House Graphics and Calligraphy Office in the production of invitations to social events.

The social secretary works on both the political and non-political functions of the presidency, coordinating events for the president, the first lady, and senior political staff. The White House social secretary serves at the president's pleasure and is appointed by each administration.

Notable office-holders
On February 25, 2011, the White House appointed Jeremy Bernard, the first male, and first openly gay, social secretary in that position's history. "I have long admired the arts and education programs that have become hallmarks of the Obama White House and I am eager to continue these efforts in the years ahead," Bernard said during the announcing press conference.

List of White House social secretaries

References

Further reading 
 Baldrige, Letitia. In the Kennedy Style: Magical Evenings in the Kennedy White House. Doubleday: 1998. .
 Clinton, Hillary Rodham. An Invitation to the White House: At Home with History. Simon & Schuster: 2000. .
 The White House: An Historic Guide. White House Historical Association and the National Geographic Society: 2001. .

External links
White House Historical Association website
Records of the White House Social Office (1952 - 1961), Dwight D. Eisenhower Presidential Library

Social Secretary
Social Secretary, White House